Dubbanamardi is a village in Dharwad district of Karnataka, India.

Demographics 
As of the 2011 Census of India, there were 139 households in Dubbanamardi with a total population of 594 (310 males and 284 females); of these, 110 were children ages 0-6.

References

Villages in Dharwad district